Military globalization is defined by David Held as "the process which embodies the growing extensity and intensity of military relations among the political units of the world-system. Understood as such, it reflects both the expanding network of worldwide military ties and relations, as well as the impact of key military technological innovations (from steamships to satellites), which over time, have reconstituted the world into a single geostrategic space".
For Robert Keohane and Joseph Nye, military globalization entails 'long-distance networks of interdependence in which force, and the threat or promise of force, are employed".

Held divides the military globalization into three distinct phenomena: 

The globalization of the war system. This refers to the "geopolitical order, great power rivalry, conflict and security relations".
The global system of arms production and transfers, reflected in the global arms dynamics.
The geo-governance of violence, "embracing the formal and informal international regulation of the acquisition, deployment and use of military force". 

All three processes above "are connected to technological development, which made them possible in the first place. The result is increasing global interdependence and complexity".

The process of military globalization starts with the Age of Discovery, when the European colonial empires began military operations on the global scale. Their "imperial rivalry led to the First World War, which was the first global conflict in world history". Keohane dates military globalization at least from the time of the conquests of Alexander the Great.

See also 
 International relations
  
 World government
 World war
 World War III
 Criticisms of globalization

References

Globalization
International relations terminology
Military historiography
globalization